Manfred W. Wagner (born 14 January 1934) is a German retired politician from the SPD. He served in the Landtag of Saarland from 1970 to 1979, and the European Parliament from 1979 to 1989.

References

See also 

 List of members of the European Parliament for West Germany, 1979–1984
 List of members of the European Parliament for West Germany, 1984–1989

Living people
1934 births
Saarland University alumni
20th-century German politicians

Members of the Landtag of Saarland
Social Democratic Party of Germany MEPs
MEPs for Germany 1979–1984
MEPs for Germany 1984–1989